The Old Church Formation is a geologic formation in Virginia and possibly Maryland. It preserves fossils dating back to the Oligocene epoch of the Paleogene period. It rarely exposes on land and is under-studied. However, deposits from this period are rare and the Old Church Formation likely contains many scientifically significant taxa. Ward (1985) recommended placing this formation in the Chesapeake Group.

Species
Some of the species known from the Old Church Formation are included below. Further study will likely reveal a more diverse fauna.

Chondrichthyans
Otodus angustidens
Hemipristis serra
Alopias vulpinus
Squatina prima?

Cetaceans
Xenorophidae sp.
Micromysticetus sp.
cf. Ankylorhiza sp.
cf. Xenorophus sloani
aff. Coronodon sp.
aff. Cotylocara sp. and Echovenator sp.
aff. Eosqualodon sp.

Chelonians
Procolpochelys charlestonensis
Carolinochelys wilsoni
Ashleychelys palmeri

Invertebrates
Mercenaria gardnerae
Anomia ruffini
"Pectin" seabeensis
"Pectin" sp.
Lucina sp.
Plicatula sp.
Epitonium sp.
Panopea sp.
Cyclocardia sp.
Astarte sp.
Pycnodonte sp.
Isognomon sp.
"Cardium" sp.
Bicorbula idonea
Macrocallista sp.
Diadora sp.
Ecphora sp.
Trophon sp.
Calypttaea sp.

See also

 List of fossiliferous stratigraphic units in Virginia
 Paleontology in Virginia

References

 

Geologic formations of Virginia